Stanisław Grocholski (June 6, 1865 in Żołynia – February 26, 1932 in Buffalo) was a Polish painter, active in Poland, Germany, and in the United States. 
He is the son of Antoni Rafał of the Syrokomla Coat of Arms.

Biography
In the years 1877 to 1880, he took classes with Władysław Łuszczkiewicz at the Jan Matejko Academy of Fine Arts in Kraków. Later, with Carl Wurzinger in Vienna, with Léon Bonnat in Paris, and with Alexander von Wagner at the Academy of Fine Arts in Munich. He lived in Munich for twenty years. Up until 1901, he lived in Neu-Pasing near Munich, after which he moved to the United States of America in Milwaukee.

In 1886, Stanisław Grocholski exhibited the interior of a church in Vienna. His first notable work was Drying of the Sore (Suszenie bielizny) in 1889, which was exhibited in Munich. He was most active in Munich, in which he sold his paintings to private collectors and exhibited some of his most notable artwork in museums and exhibitions. From there he sent his artwork for exhibitions to Warsaw, Kraków and Lwów (then Poland, now Lviv in Ukraine).

He lived with his wife, Izabela Pawłowska in a villa in New-Pasing on the outskirts of Munich, and turned his house into a colony for Polish artists. In 1891, he founded his own drawing school; where inter alia have studied: Gustaw Gwozdecki, Karol Kowalski-Wierusz, Henryk Szczygliński, Soter Małachowski Jaxa, and Józef Gałęzowski have studied.

He painted portraits, genre art (especially Hutsuls folklore and Jewish folklore), as well as religious art for churches in Poland. Between the years 1880 to 1900, he exhibited his paintings at the Glaspalast in Munich. He had also worked with the journals  "Gardenlaube" and "Moderne", where woodcuttings would be placed in, based on his artworks. In Poland, reproduction of the artist's work were placed in the journals "Kłosy" and "Tygodnik Ilustrowany".

He painted the interior scenes of folk cottages, conveying the everyday life of the people, capturing: the celebrations, indulgence, sickness and fighting.

Selected paintings

References

External links

1858 births
1932 deaths
People from Łańcut County
People from the Kingdom of Galicia and Lodomeria
19th-century Polish painters
19th-century Polish male artists
20th-century Polish painters
20th-century Polish male artists
Polish portrait painters
Polish male painters